Vitali Aleksandrovich Gorulyov (born 30 July 1998) is a Russian football player. He plays for FC Sokol Saratov.

Club career
He made his debut in the Russian Football National League for FC Zenit-2 Saint Petersburg on 8 July 2017 in a game against FC Shinnik Yaroslavl.

References

External links
 
 Profile by Russian Football National League

1998 births
Footballers from Saint Petersburg
Living people
Russian footballers
Association football midfielders
Russia youth international footballers
FC Zenit Saint Petersburg players
FC Zenit-2 Saint Petersburg players
FC Volgar Astrakhan players
FC SKA-Khabarovsk players
FC Tyumen players
FC Sokol Saratov players
Russian First League players
Russian Second League players